Current Medicinal Chemistry is a peer-reviewed medical journal published by Bentham Science Publishers. The editor-in-chief is Atta-ur-Rahman, FRS (Kings College University of Cambridge Cambridge, UK). The journal covers developments in medicinal chemistry and rational drug design and publishes original research reports and review papers.

Abstracting and indexing 
Current Medicinal Chemistry is indexed in the following databases: 
Chemical Abstracts Service/CASSI
EMBASE
EMBiology
MEDLINE
Science Citation Index Expanded
Scopus
According to the Journal Citation Reports, the journal has a 2019 impact factor of 4.184, ranking it 16th out of 59 journals in the category "Chemistry, Medicinal".

References

External links

Medicinal chemistry journals
Publications established in 1994
Bentham Science Publishers academic journals
English-language journals
Journals published between 27 and 51 times per year